Ohel Moshe ("Tent of Moses") may refer to:

Ohel Moshe (former neighborhood in Tel Aviv)
Ohel Moshe (neighborhood in Jerusalem), today part of Nachlaot
Ohel Moshe Synagogue, today the Shanghai Jewish Refugees Museum
 Yeshiva Ohel Moshe is a school in Bensonhurst (Brooklyn, NY)